Graveyard Shift is a 1990 American horror film directed by Ralph S. Singleton, written by John Esposito, starring David Andrews, Stephen Macht, Kelly Wolf, and Brad Dourif, and based on the 1970 short story of the same name by Stephen King which was first published in the October 1970 issue of Cavalier magazine, and later collected in King's 1978 collection Night Shift. The film was released in October 1990.

Plot
Widowed drifter John Hall is hired to work in a rat-infested textile mill by the sadistic mill foreman, Warwick. Warwick has been carrying on numerous affairs with female workers, the latest being Nordello. Warwick has hired an eccentric rat exterminator Tucker Cleveland to take care of the rat problem. Cleveland confides in Hall that he is unable to kill all of the rats and the mill should be shut down. In the following weeks, Hall is bullied by both his fellow workers Danson, Brogan, and Stevenson, and Warwick, who holds a special hatred for him. Hall begins a romantic relationship with his coworker Jane Wisconsky. 

Warwick is informed that the basement must be cleaned up to make way for new offices. Warwick assigns Stevenson to look through the basement before he assigns a crew to clean it out. Stevenson is grabbed by an unseen creature and dragged away.

Warwick assigns Hall, Wisconsky, and several other workers to clean the basement. That night, Nordello breaks in to steal documents showing recommendations for the mill’s closure from Warwick. Nordello falls down the stairs into the basement, where the creature devours her. Tucker Cleveland is killed while investigating a nearby graveyard which Warwick believes to be the breeding ground for the rats.

Hall discovers a trap door leading to an abandoned part of the mill, which he believes to be the nesting ground. Warwick forces Hall to enter with a fire hose to kill the rats. Hall agrees on the condition that Warwick help him in handling the fire hose. Wisconsky also volunteers, and Warwick forces the remaining workers to go. One by one, the creature kills each member of the group until only Hall and Wisconsky are left.

Hall and Wisconsky discover the creature’s lair, a large cavern filled with human and animal bones. Wisconsky discovers Warwick with a severe head wound buried beneath a pile of bones. Now insane, Warwick attacks Hall and Wisconsky, engaging Hall in a brutal battle. Wisconsky attempts to stop him, only to be stabbed by Warwick with a knife. Warwick flees from a vengeful Hall, only to discover the creature: a large, bat-like rat. Warwick attacks and injures it, only to be killed and devoured. Seeing this, Hall flees and manages to escape into the mill. The creature follows him and attacks him, only for its tail to be caught in the cotton picker. Hall turns on the cotton picker, tearing the creature apart. The final shot shows a sign outside the still-open mill, stating the mill is under new management.

TV Extended Ending
Hall punches out ending his shift and he also punches Wisconsky's shift before leaving the mill.

Cast

Production
The film was shot in the village of Harmony, Maine at Bartlettyarns Inc., the oldest woolen yarn mill in the United States (est. 1821). The historic Bartlett mill was renamed "Bachman" for the movie, an homage to King's pseudonym, Richard Bachman. The interior shots of the antique mill machinery, and the riverside cemetery, were in Harmony. Other scenes (restaurant interior, and giant wool picking machine) were at locations in Bangor, Maine, at an abandoned waterworks and armory. A few other mill scenes were staged near the Eastland woolen mill in Corinna, Maine, which subsequently became a Superfund site.

Reception
The film was received poorly by critics. On the review aggregator website Rotten Tomatoes, it holds a rare 0% approval rating based on seven reviews. Audiences surveyed by CinemaScore gave the film a grade of "C−" on scale of A+ to F.

Graveyard Shift was a modest box office success for Paramount. The film was released October 26, 1990 in the United States, opening in first place that weekend. It grossed a total of $11,582,891 domestically.

Stephen King heavily disliked the film and named it one of his least favorite adaptations calling it "a quick exploitation picture".

Home media
Graveyard Shift was released on VHS and Laserdisc in 1991. The DVD was released on May 28, 2002, and re-released on August 15, 2017 by Paramount Home Entertainment. Columbia TriStar released the film on Region DVDs and VHS from 1992-2003. The film was released on Blu-ray in France on October 3, 2011, Spain and Germany in 2017. On July 28, 2020, Shout! Factory under the Scream Factory label released the film on Blu-ray.

Soundtrack
A limited edition soundtrack release, featuring the score by Anthony Marinelli and Brian Banks, was released on October 6, 2020 from La-La Land Records.

References

External links
 
 

1990 films
1990 horror films
1990s monster movies
American monster movies
American natural horror films
Films scored by Anthony Marinelli
Films based on short fiction
Films based on works by Stephen King
Films set in Maine
Films shot in Maine
Paramount Pictures films
Columbia Pictures films
1990s English-language films
1990s American films